Alexandr Belousov (born 14 May 1998) is a Moldovan footballer who plays as a defender for Bulgarian club Spartak Varna.

Club career
Belousov made his professional debut for Sheriff Tiraspol in the Moldovan National Division on 24 June 2018, coming on as a 90th-minute substitute in the away match against Zimbru Chișinău, which finished as a 1–0 win.

He was loaned out to Dinamo-Auto Tiraspol for the first half of the 2020–21 season. On 5 March 2022, he was loaned out to Sfîntul Gheorghe for the rest of the 2021–22 season. In November 2022, Belousov signed a one-and-a-half year contract with Bulgarian club Spartak Varna.

International career
He made his debut for Moldova national football team on 18 November 2020 in a Nations League game against Kosovo. He substituted Dan Spătaru in the 85th minute.

Personal life
Belousov is of Russian descent.

Career statistics

Club

Honours
Sheriff Tiraspol
Moldovan National Division: 2018, 2019, 2020–21
Moldovan Cup: 2018–19

References

External links
 
 

1998 births
Living people
Moldovan footballers
Moldova youth international footballers
Moldova under-21 international footballers
Moldova international footballers
Moldovan people of Russian descent
Association football defenders
FC Sheriff Tiraspol players
FC Dinamo-Auto Tiraspol players
FC Sfîntul Gheorghe players
PFC Spartak Varna players
Moldovan Super Liga players